Vihovići is a suburban neighborhood of Mostar, Bosnia and Herzegovina.

Demographics 
According to the 2013 census, its population was 1,987.

References

Populated places in Mostar
Villages in the Federation of Bosnia and Herzegovina